Eduardo Lúcio Esteves Pereira (born 1 September 1954 in Leça da Palmeira, Matosinhos), known as Lúcio, is a Portuguese retired footballer who played as a goalkeeper.

External links

1954 births
Living people
Sportspeople from Matosinhos
Portuguese footballers
Association football forwards
Primeira Liga players
Liga Portugal 2 players
Segunda Divisão players
Leixões S.C. players
Varzim S.C. players
F.C. Tirsense players
Portugal international footballers